Leucostrophus commasiae is a moth of the family Sphingidae. It is known from west Africa to Gabon and to Kasai in south-western Congo
.

The abdomen upperside has a bluish white belt on tergites three and four.

References

Macroglossini
Moths described in 1856
Moths of Africa
Fauna of the Central African Republic
Fauna of the Republic of the Congo
Fauna of Gabon